Chahar Right Rear Banner (Цахар баруун гарын хойд хошуу; Čaqar Baraɣun Ɣarun Qoyitu qosiɣu) is a banner of Inner Mongolia, People's Republic of China, bordering Shangdu County to the northeast, Xinghe County to the southeast, Qahar Right Front Banner to the south, Zhuozi County to the southwest, Qahar Right Rear Banner to the west, Dorbod Banner to the northwest, and Xilingol League to the north. It is under the administration of Ulanqab City, which lies to the south along the G55 Erenhot–Guangzhou Expressway. The most important settlement in the banner is Baiyinchagan.

Climate

References

www.xzqh.org 

Banners of Inner Mongolia
Ulanqab